George Simon may refer to:

 George T. Simon (1912–2001), American jazz writer
 George Simon (athlete) (born 1942), sprinter from Trinidad and Tobago
 George Simon (artist) (1947–2020), Lokono Arawak artist and archaeologist from Guyana
 George K. Simon (born 1948), self-help book author

See also 
 George Simion